Alejandro Enrique Cíchero Konarek (born April 20, 1977) is a former Venezuelan footballer who played as a defender.

Career
Born in Caracas, Cichero joined the youth system of Trujillanos Fútbol Club in 1988, being promoted to the first team in 1996 and helping them reach the Copa CONMEBOL Playoff in his second season.

In 1998, he moved to Europe, joining Benfica, who immediately loaned him to Cagliari Calcio in the Serie A, playing thirteen matches over the course of the 1998–99 season. He then spent two seasons in the Portuguese Second Division — the third tier of Portuguese football. First in 1999–2000 at Oliveira do Bairro S.C. and then at Benfica's reserve team, where he made one bench appearance on the first team in a 2–1 win against Porto.

In 2002, he returned home, playing the 2001–02 season at Deportivo Italchacao, before spending an 18-month span in the Uruguayan Primera División, in three clubs. In 2004, he returned to Europe, joining PFC Litex Lovech in the Bulgarian league, where he would stay until 2008, helping the team finish third in 2005–06, as well progressing to the Round of 32 in the UEFA Cup.

The 31-year-old then joined Chinese team, Shandong Luneng Taishan F.C., immediately conquering his first title, the 2008 Chinese Super League. After two seasons, he returned to his native hometown, to play for Caracas FC. In July 2010, the Venezuelan international, moved to Colombia, reuniting with former national team manager, Richard Páez at Millonarios.

In 2013, the 36-year-old, came out of retirement to play one more season, joining Deportivo Anzoátegui.

International career
He played in the 2004 and 2007 editions of Copa America. He has made over 40 appearances for the Venezuela national team since 2002.

International goals

|-
| 1. || June 1, 2007 || José Pachencho Romero, Maracaibo,Venezuela ||  || 1–1 || 2–2 || Friendly
|-
| 2. || June 30, 2007 || Pueblo Nuevo, San Cristóbal, Venezuela ||  || 1–0 || 2–0 || 2007 Copa América
|}

Personal life
He is the son of Mauro Cichero who was a professional football player and represented Venezuela in the 1980 Olympics.  His brothers, Gabriel and Mauro, are also professional football players.

Honors
Champion of the Chinese Super League with Shandong Luneng Taishan FC in 2008

Champion of the Venezuelan 1st Division with Caracas FC in 2009-10

References

External links
 
 

1977 births
Living people
Footballers from Caracas
Association football defenders
Venezuelan people of Italian descent
Venezuelan people of Polish descent
Venezuelan footballers
Venezuela international footballers
2004 Copa América players
2007 Copa América players
Trujillanos FC players
Cagliari Calcio players
S.L. Benfica B players
Deportivo Italia players
Central Español players
C.A. Cerro players
Club Nacional de Football players
PFC Litex Lovech players
Shandong Taishan F.C. players
Caracas FC players
Millonarios F.C. players
Deportivo Anzoátegui players
Categoría Primera A players
Uruguayan Primera División players
First Professional Football League (Bulgaria) players
Chinese Super League players
Venezuelan expatriate footballers
Expatriate footballers in Colombia
Venezuelan expatriate sportspeople in Colombia
Expatriate footballers in Uruguay
Venezuelan expatriate sportspeople in Uruguay
Expatriate footballers in Portugal
Venezuelan expatriate sportspeople in Portugal
Expatriate footballers in Bulgaria
Venezuelan expatriate sportspeople in Bulgaria
Expatriate footballers in Italy
Venezuelan expatriate sportspeople in Italy
Expatriate footballers in China
Venezuelan expatriate sportspeople in China